Yvonne Hayes Hinson is an American politician who currently serves as the representative for Florida House of Representatives District 20 as a member of the Democratic Party.

Career 
She was elected to the State House in 2020.

She endorsed Charlie Crist for the 2022 Florida gubernatorial election.

On April 21, 2022, Hinson attempted to stage a sit-in demonstration to prevent a vote on Florida's congressional district maps. Opponents of the tactic compared her actions to an insurrection. The demonstration was ultimately unsuccessful.

Elections

References

External links 
 Official website

Living people
Democratic Party members of the Florida House of Representatives
Women state legislators in Florida
21st-century American politicians
21st-century American women politicians
Year of birth missing (living people)
African-American state legislators in Florida